Dhubaria Union is a union of Nagarpur Upazila, Tangail District, Bangladesh. It is situated 6 km south of Nagarpur and 30 km south of Tangail city.

Demographics

According to Population Census 2011 performed by Bangladesh Bureau of Statistics, The total population of Dhubaria union is 12,760. There are 2,958 households in total.

Education

The literacy rate of Dhubaria Union is 47.4% (Male-52.4%, Female-43.1%).

Transport
There is a direct bus service from Dhaka to Dhubaria via Manikganj District called "Village Line". The buses start from Gabtoli Bus Terminal, Mirpur, Dhaka. Last stoppage of this bus service is Dhubaria Bazar, Nagarpur, Tangail.

Notable residents
 Tarana Halim, Actress, Lawyer & Politician
 Md Jamilur Rahman Miron, Politician, Four times elected Mayor of Tangail city

See also
 Union Councils of Tangail District

References

Populated places in Dhaka Division
Populated places in Tangail District
Unions of Nagarpur Upazila